Wethersfield High School may refer to:

Wethersfield High School (Connecticut), Wethersfield, Connecticut
Wethersfield High School (Illinois), Kewanee, Illinois